Lincoln is a hamlet and unincorporated community in South Harrison Township, Gloucester County, New Jersey, United States.

Formerly known as Stringtown, it is located in the southeastern part of the township, near the border with Salem County. It contained a grist mill, saw mill and a few houses. The grist mill was purchased in 1828 by James Jessup, who then purchased the saw mill in 1833.

References

South Harrison Township, New Jersey
Unincorporated communities in Gloucester County, New Jersey
Unincorporated communities in New Jersey